La Rambla may refer to:
 La Rambla, Barcelona, Spain;
 La Rambla, Córdoba, Spain;